The 1972 United States presidential election in Alabama was held on November 7, 1972. Incumbent President Richard Nixon won Alabama, winning 72.43% of the vote to George McGovern's 25.54%. This is also the best showing in the state by a Republican presidential candidate. , this is the last election in which Dallas County, Hale County, Russell County, and Perry County voted for the Republican candidate, and stands as the strongest ever performance by a Republican presidential candidate in the state.

In Alabama, voters voted for electors individually instead of as a slate, as in the other states.

With 72.43% of the popular vote, Alabama would prove to be Nixon's fourth strongest state in the 1972 election after Mississippi, Georgia and Oklahoma.

Results

Result by county

See also
United States presidential elections in Alabama

Notes

References

Alabama
1972
1972 Alabama elections